Tomoko Fuse (Fuse Tomoko, born in Niigata, 1951) is a Japanese origami artist and author of numerous books on the subject of modular origami, and is by many considered as a renowned master in such discipline.

Fuse first learned origami while in the hospital as a child. When she was 19 years old, she studied for two and a half years with origami master Toyoaki Kawai. She started publishing origami books in 1981, and has since published more than 60 books (plus overseas editions) . She has created numerous origami designs, including boxes, kusudama, paper toys, masks, modular polyhedra, as well as other geometric forms and objects, such as origami tessellations, with publications in Japanese, Korean and English. 
She now resides with her husband Taro Toriumi, a respected woodblock printmaker and etcher, in rural Nagano prefecture, Japan.

Unit Origami: Multidimensional Transformations, the English language edition of her seminal modular origami inventions, may be considered the classic text on modular origami available in the English language.

Publications

In English:
Spiral: Origami/Art/Design, Viereck Verlag, 2012, 
Floral Origami Globes, Japan Publications Trading, May 18, 2007, 
Origami Rings & Wreaths: A Kaleidoscope of 28 Decorative Origami Creations, Japan Publications Trading, Nov 2007 
Kusudama Origami, Japan Publications, Sep 2002, 
Fabulous Origami Boxes, Japan Publications, July 1998 
Quick and Easy Origami Boxes, Japan Publications 1994, 
Unit Origami: Multidimensional Transformation, Japan Publications, April 1990, 
Origami Boxes: Moribana Style, Japan Publications, June 1975, 
Origami Boxes, Japan Publications, July 1989, Tomoko Fuse's Origami Boxes, Tuttle Publications, April 2018, 

In Japanese:
Easy Origami to Enliven Your Life (Kurashi o Irodoru Raku Raku no Origami) Ishizue Publishers (July 1996), 
Yunnito Origami (Unit Origami), Chikuma Shobo Publishers (December 1983), 
Beautiful Origami Boxes 2, Nihonvogue Company, Japan, 2014, 手づくりタウン│日本ヴォーグ社, 
I Love Origami: The Mask,Origami House, 1997, 

In Italian:
Origami Modulare (Italian version of Japanese Yunnito Origami), Il Castello Publishers, (1988)

References

Origami artists
1951 births
Living people